WSIC (1400 kHz) is a commercial AM radio station in Statesville, North Carolina.  The station carries a talk radio format and is owned by Iredell Broadcasting, Inc.  Mark Sanger is the President and CEO.  WSIC-TV is broadcast over-the-web via the internet and social media (local programming only).  WSIC airs live programs from a radio/TV hybrid studio at 1117 Radio Road in Statesville.

WSIC is powered at 1,000 watts, using a non-directional antenna.  It is also heard on two FM translator stations: 100.7 W264CU in Statesville.  And 105.9 W290DK in Mooresville.

Programming
On weekdays, WSIC's schedule includes Pat Shannon, Sean Hannity, Dana Loesch, Todd Starnes, "Coast to Coast AM with George Noory" and "This Morning, America's First News with Gordon Deal."  World and national news is provided by Fox News Radio.  WSIC is an affiliate of the Carolina Panthers NFL Radio Network.

History
On May 3, 1947, the station signed on the air. Its former FM sister station WSIC-FM, signed on the same day.  (The FM station later changed its call sign to WFMX before being sold off in July 2006.  It is now WVBZ Clemmons, a mainstream rock station owned by iHeartMedia, Inc.)

WSIC-AM-FM were the first AM and FM co-owned radio stations to sign on simultaneously in the nation.  They were owned by the Statesville Broadcasting Company.  In the 1950s through the 1980s, WSIC had a full service middle of the road format, featuring popular adult music, news, sports and information.  Some of WSIC's alumni include Ty Boyd and Harold Johnson.  Johnson was a four-time local Emmy Award winner and noted Sports Director of WSOC-TV in Charlotte.  Johnson later served as WSIC's morning host.  His show on WSIC was a mix of politics and humor.

WSIC later added FM translator stations on 100.7 FM in Statesville and 105.9 FM in Mooresville.

References

SIC
News and talk radio stations in the United States
Radio stations established in 1947
1947 establishments in North Carolina